The 2017–18 season will be Peterborough United's 58th year in the Football League and their fifth consecutive season in the third tier, League One. Along with League One, the club will also participate in the FA Cup, EFL Cup and EFL Trophy. The season covers the period from 1 July 2017 to 30 June 2018.

Squad

Statistics

|-
!colspan=14|Out on loan:
 

|}

Goals record

Disciplinary record

Transfers

Transfers in

Transfers out

Loans in

Loans out

Competitions

Friendlies
As of 28 June 2017 Peterborough United have announced seven pre-season friendlies against Queens Park Rangers, St Albans City, Wolverhampton Wanderers, Ipswich Town, Cheltenham Town, Lincoln City and Deeping Rangers.

League One

League table

Results summary

Results by matchday

Matches
On 21 June 2017, the league fixtures were announced.

FA Cup
On 16 October 2017, Peterborough United were drawn at home to Tranmere Rovers in the first round. A 1–1 draw meant a replay would be played at Prenton Park. Victory over Woking in the second round replay set up a third round trip to Villa Park.

EFL Cup
On 16 June 2017, Peterborough United were drawn at home to Barnet in the first round.

EFL Trophy
On 12 July 2017, the group stage draw was completed with Peterborough facing Cambridge United, Northampton Town and Southampton U23s in Southern Group H. After topping the group, Peterborough United were drawn at home to Southend United in the second round. Luton Town away was announced for the third round.

References

Peterborough United F.C. seasons
Peterborough United